Laviniinae is a clade of the subfamily Leuciscinae, treated as a subfamily of the freshwater fish family Leuciscidae by some authorities, which contains the true minnows. Members of this clade are known as western chubs or the western clade (WC) of minnows. As the name suggests, most members of this clade are found in western North America aside from Chrosomus, which is found in eastern North America.

One of the largest North American cypriniforms and the largest member of Leuciscidae, the Colorado pikeminnow (Ptychocheilus lucius), belongs to this subfamily.

Genera
 Acrocheilus (chiselmouth)
 Chrosomus (typical daces)
 Eremichthys (desert dace)
 †Evarra (Mexican daces)
 Gila (western chubs)
 Hesperoleucus (California roach)
 Lavinia (hitch)
 Moapa (moapa dace)
 Mylopharodon (hardheads)
 Orthodon (Sacramento blackfish)
 Ptychocheilus (pikeminnows)
 Relictus (relict dace)
 Siphateles

References

Laviniinae
Fish subfamilies

Taxa named by Pieter Bleeker